Defending the Throne of Evil is the fourth studio album by the Norwegian black metal band Carpathian Forest. It was released on September 23, 2003 by Season of Mist. A remastered, deluxe double LP version with a bonus track was also released in 2007.

Track listing

Personnel
 Carpathian Forest
 Roger Rasmussen (Nattefrost) — vocals, guitars
 Anders Kobro — drums, percussion
 Daniel Vrangsinn — guitars, bass, keyboards
 Terje Vik Schei (Tchort) — guitars

 Session musicians
 Arvid Thorsen (Mötorsen) — tenor saxophone

 Other staff
 Daniel Orstad — photography
 Terje Refsnes — engineering, production, sound effects, noises
 Nattefrost and Vrangsinn — production, cover art, artwork, graphics, photography

References

Carpathian Forest albums
2003 albums
Season of Mist albums